The 2022 Temple Owls football team represented Temple University in the 2022 NCAA Division I FBS football season. They played their home games at Lincoln Financial Field in Philadelphia, Pennsylvania, and were led by 1st-year head coach Stan Drayton, competing as a member of the American Athletic Conference (The American).

Previous season 

The Owls finished the 2021 season 3–9, 1–7 in AAC play to finish in last in the conference.

Preseason
New athletic director Arthur Johnson fired Rod Carey after three years on the job due to underperforming results. Texas associate head coach and running backs coach Stan Drayton was hired as his replacement.

Schedule

Schedule Source:

Game summaries

at Duke

Lafayette

Rutgers

UMass

at Memphis

at UCF

Tulsa

at Navy

South Florida

at Houston

Cincinnati

East Carolina

Personnel

References

Temple
Temple Owls football seasons
2022 in sports in Pennsylvania